Turiisk is an urban settlement (town) in Volyn Oblast (province) in Ukraine, located in the historic region of the Volhynia. It is located in Kovel Raion. Population:

History
During World War II, in 1942, Jews of the village were murdered by an Einsatzgruppen assisted by auxiliary police in a mass execution.

References

External links
 Turiisk at the Ukrainian Soviet Encyclopedia

Urban-type settlements in Kovel Raion
Volhynian Voivodeship (1569–1795)
Kovelsky Uyezd
Wołyń Voivodeship (1921–1939)
Jewish Ukrainian history
Holocaust locations in Ukraine